Haymarket District may refer to:

 Haymarket Commercial Historic District in Council Bluffs, Iowa
 Haymarket Historic District in Kalamazoo, Michigan
 Haymarket District (Lincoln, Nebraska)